Turner Layton (July 2, 1894 – February 6, 1978), born John Turner Layton, Jr., was an African American songwriter, singer and pianist. He frequently worked with Henry Creamer.

Life
Born in Washington, D.C., United States, in 1894, he was the son of John Turner Layton, "a bass singer, music educator and hymn composer." After receiving a musical education from his father, he attended the Howard University Dental School, later coming to New York City in the early 1900s, where he met future songwriting partner, lyricist Henry Creamer. Layton is best known for his many compositions with Creamer, the best known of which is the standard "After You've Gone", written in 1918 and first popularized by Sophie Tucker. Turner and Creamer had another hit with Way Down Yonder in New Orleans in 1922. It was recorded in 1927 by Frank Trumbauer (with Bix Beiderbecke), and was a rock and roll hit for Freddy Cannon in 1959. Turner and Layton contributed music and lyrics to many Broadway shows, including the Ziegfeld Follies of 1917, 1921 and 1922, Three Showers (1920), Some Party (1922) and Creamer's own Strut Miss Lizzie (1922).

Beginning in 1924, Layton found major popular success in England with Clarence "Tandy" Johnstone as a member of the group Layton & Johnstone, quickly earning a reputation as a cabaret act, with the pair allegedly selling over "10 million records". Layton split with Johnstone in 1935 (after Johnstone had been named in Albert Sandler's divorce), with Johnstone returning to New York and continuing to perform with significantly less success. Layton continued to perform in England. An elegant song stylist, he held a regular, successful spot over the years at the Café de Paris, a London club, until his retirement in 1946.

He died in London in February 1978, at the age of 83.

Recordings
Two albums of Layton & Johnstone recordings have been issued on CD in the UK - on ASV Living Era (CD AJA 5426) and Flapper (PAST CD 9712). Two compilation albums of recordings by Layton have been released on CD.

Legacy
His daughter A'Lelia Shirley inherited his musical estate and left the copyright and royalties to her father's music to Great Ormond Street Hospital for Children in London in her will on her death in January 2001.

Notable compositions
"After You've Gone"
"Dear Old Southland"
"Goodbye Alexander, Goodbye Honey Boy"
"It Must Be Love"
"Strut, Miss Lizzie"
"'Way down Yonder in New Orleans"

References

External links
Biography at AllMusic
 Turner Layton recordings at the Discography of American Historical Recordings

1894 births
1978 deaths
Songwriters from Washington, D.C.
American male songwriters
20th-century American musicians
20th-century American male musicians
African-American songwriters
20th-century African-American musicians